An Myong-ok is a North Korean politician.  He served as a delegate to all sessions of the Supreme People's Assembly, from the 8th in 1986 to the 11th in 2003.

See also
 Politics of North Korea
 List of Koreans

References
 Yonhap News Agency.  "Who's who in North Korea," pp. 787–812 in 

Living people
Members of the Supreme People's Assembly
Year of birth missing (living people)